In Japanese social science,  is similar to livelihood; the conscious and non-submissive activity of ordinary people in shaping their lives. The study of seikatsu is an interdisciplinary field of the social sciences.

See also 

 Livelihood

References

Cultural studies
Japanese culture
Japanese words and phrases